Toynbee is a surname. Notable people with the surname include:

 Arnold Toynbee (1852–1883), British economic historian
 Arnold Joseph Toynbee (1889–1975), British historian
 Geoffrey Toynbee (1885–1914), English cricketer
 Henry Toynbee (1819–1909), British merchant sailor and meteorologist
 Jocelyn Toynbee (1897–1985), British archaeologist and art historian
 Joseph Toynbee (1815–1866), British physician, pioneer of otolaryngology
 Matthew Toynbee (born 1956), New Zealand cricketer
 Paget Toynbee (1855–1932), British Dante scholar
 Philip Toynbee (1916–1981), British writer
 Polly Toynbee (born 1946), British journalist and writer

See also
 Toynbee Hall, a settlement in London inspired by and named in honour of Arnold Toynbee
 The Toynbee Convector, a time-travel story by Ray Bradbury, vaguely based on the philosophy of Arnold Joseph Toynbee 
 Toynbee's law of challenge and response, after Arnold J. Toynbee.
 Toynbee tiles, mysterious tiles embedded in the streets of a number of US and South American cities
 The X-Men character Toad, whose 'real name' is Mortimer Toynbee